Edenton-Chowan Schools is a PK–12 graded school district serving Chowan County, North Carolina, including the town of Edenton. It was formed from the merger of Edenton City Schools and Chowan County Schools in 1968. Its four schools serve 2,393 students as of the 2010–11 school year.

History
The North Carolina General Assembly passed a session law in 1967 authorizing the school systems of Edenton City Schools and Chowan County Schools to merge. This officially occurred the next year, the system becoming Edenton-Chowan Schools.

Student demographics
For the 2010–11 school year, Edenton-Chowan Schools had a total population of 2,393 students and 170.91 teachers on a (FTE) basis. This produced a student-teacher ratio of 14.00:1. That same year, out of the student total, the gender ratio was 53% male to 47% female. The demographic group makeup was: Black, 43%; White, 50%; Hispanic, 4%; American Indian, 0%; and Asian/Pacific Islander, 0% (two or more races: 3%). For the same school year, 64.55% of the students received free and reduced-cost lunches.

Governance
The primary governing body of Edenton-Chowan Schools follows a council–manager government format with a seven-member Board of Education appointing a Superintendent to run the day-to-day operations of the system. The school system currently resides in the North Carolina State Board of Education's First District.

Board of Education
The seven members of the Board of Education generally meet on the first Monday of each month. They are elected by district to staggered six-year terms. The current members of the board are:

 District 1: Gene Jordan, Jean Bunch
 District 2: Ricky Browder, John Guard (Chair)
 District 3: Gil Burroughs, Kay Wright (Vice-Chair)
 At-large: Glorious Elliott

Superintendent
The current superintendent of the system is Michael Sasscer, Ed.D.

Member schools
Edenton-Chowan Schools has four schools ranging from pre-kindergarten to twelfth grade. Those four schools are separated into one high school, one middle school, and two elementary schools.

High school
 John A. Holmes High School (Edenton)

Middle school
 Chowan Middle School (Tyner)

Elementary schools
 D. F. Walker Elementary School (Edenton)
 White Oak Elementary School (Edenton)

Achievements and awards
Edenton-Chowan Schools has had one school listed as a Blue Ribbon School: John A. Holmes High School (1984–85). The system has had one teacher recognized as a North Carolina Department of Public Instruction Teacher of the Year: James Bell in 2007–08.

See also
List of school districts in North Carolina

References

External links
 

Education in Chowan County, North Carolina
School districts in North Carolina
School districts established in 1968